The Romance of the Condor Heroes is a 2014–15 Chinese television series produced by Yu Zheng and adapted from Jin Yong's novel The Return of the Condor Heroes, with additional material from the preceding novel, The Legend of the Condor Heroes. It stars Chen Xiao and Michelle Chen in the lead roles. The series was first broadcast on Hunan TV from 3 December 2014 to 11 March 2015.

Plot
The protagonist, Yang Guo, is the orphaned son of Yang Kang, the antagonist in The Legend of the Condor Heroes. The couple Guo Jing and Huang Rong take Yang Guo under their care for a short period of time before sending him to the Quanzhen School on Mount Zhongnan for better guidance in moral values and orthodox martial arts.

In Quanzhen, Yang Guo is often bullied by his fellow seniors, and discriminated against by his master, Zhao Zhijing. Yang Guo flees from Quanzhen and ventures unknowingly into the nearby Tomb of the Living Dead, where the Ancient Tomb School is housed. He is saved by Xiaolongnü, a mysterious maiden of unknown origin, and becomes her apprentice. They live together in the tomb for many years until Yang Guo grows up.
 
Yang Guo and Xiaolongnü develop romantic feelings for each other, but their romance is forbidden by the prevailing norms of the jianghu (or wulin, the community of martial artists). Throughout the story, their love meets with several trials, such as the misunderstandings that threaten to tear them apart, and their encounter with Gongsun Zhi, whom Xiaolongnü almost marries at one point.

Finally, after their reunion and marriage, Xiaolongnü leaves Yang Guo again, owing to her belief she cannot recover from a fatal poison, and promises to meet him again 16 years later. While Yang Guo is wandering the jianghu alone, he meets several formidable martial artists and a giant condor, and improves his skills tremendously after training from them. His adventures gradually mould him into a courageous hero and the most powerful martial artist of his time.

Yang Guo serves his native land by helping the Han Chinese people of the Song Empire resist invaders from the Mongol Empire. At the end of the drama, he is reunited with Xiaolongnü and they leave to lead the rest of their lives in seclusion after receiving praises and blessings from the wulin.

Cast

 Chen Xiao as Yang Guo / Yang Kang
 Leo Wu as Yang Guo (young)
 Michelle Chen as Xiaolongnü
 Zhang Zimu as Xiaolongnü (young)
 Zheng Guolin as Guo Jing
 Yang Mingna as Huang Rong
 Zhang Xinyu as Li Mochou
 Mao Xiaotong as Guo Fu
 Jiang Yiyi as Guo Fu (young)
 Sun Yaoqi as Lu Wushuang
 Hu Shun'er as Lu Wushuang (young)
 Zhao Yingzi as Cheng Ying
 Chai Wei as Cheng Ying (young)
 Heizi as Jinlun Guoshi
 Zhang Xueying as Guo Xiang
 Cui Zhengbang as Guo Polu
 Zhang Zhehan as Yelü Qi
 Ma Yingqiao as Yelü Yan
 Wang Shuang as Wanyan Ping
 Cao Xinyue as Hong Lingbo
 Wu Jingjing as Gongsun Lü'e
 Qiu Xinzhi as Gongsun Zhi
 Zhang Qian as Qiu Qianchi
 Li Shipeng as Qiu Qianren / Ci'en
 Zhang Chao as Wu Dunru
 Zhang Yijie as Wu Dunru (young)
 Elvis Han as Wu Xiuwen
 Fang Yangfei as Wu Xiuwen (young)
 Zhao Kunpeng as Wu Santong
 Zhang Yameng as Wu Sanniang
 Guo Yuhan as Shagu
 Christopher Lee as Huang Yaoshi
 Zong Fengyan as Ouyang Feng
 Yin Xiaotian as Hong Qigong
 Zhou Dehua as Zhou Botong
 Ji Chen as Yideng
 Deng Limin as Ke Zhen'e
 Shen Baoping as Qiu Chuji
 Zhang Tianyang as Huodu
 Daiding as Da'erba
 Shao Min as Granny Sun
 Wang Maolei as Zhao Zhijing
 Song Yang as Zhen Zhibing
 Meng Fei as Yelü Chucai
 Kang Lei as Ma Guangzuo
 Yang Long as Nimoxing
 Rong Yaozhong as Yinkexi
 Ruan Weijing as Xiaoxiangzi
 Yao Yichen as Chen Xuanfeng
 Hou Jingjian as Feng Mofeng
 Yi Kun as Lu Guanying
 Liu Ye as Cheng Yaojia
 Li Yilin as Zhu Ziliu
 Zhu Rongrong as Möngke Khan
 Luo Wenbo as Lin Chaoying's apprentice
 Wang Yuzheng as Lu Youjiao
 Sun Xinhong as He Shiwo
 Jian Renzi as Rou'er
 Chen Tingjia as Du Xuelian (Ouyang Feng's sister-in-law)
 Hu Pu as Fan Yiweng
 Hou Jianglong as Indian Monk
 Ren Xihong as Shi Da
 Zhao Haiying as Shi Er
 Shi Puzhou as Shi San
 Niu Wenbo as Shi Si
 Feng Mingjing as Shi Wu
 Xu Zhanwei as Datougui
 Zhang Luhua as Shashengui
 Du Guanru as Taozhaigui
 Peng Yong as Wuchanggui
 Yu Xiaochen as Baicaoxian
 Shi Zhenlong as Renchuzi
 Lü Yang as Gourou Toutuo
 Tan Limin as Abbess Shengyin
 Wen Wen as Xiaocui (Zhao Zhijing's secret lover)
 Xing Qiqi as Li Zhichang

Special appearances 

 Yan Yikuan as Wang Chongyang
 Dong Xuan as Lin Chaoying
 Zanilia Zhao as Mu Nianci
 Chen Xiang as Lu Zhanyuan
 Deng Sha as He Yuanjun
 Yang Rong as Mei Chaofeng
 Huang Yi as Feng Heng
 Zhang Danfeng as Dugu Qiubai
 Qin Lan as Hexiang (Dugu Qiubai's wife)
 Zhang Meng as Mingyue / Liu Ying
 Zhu Zixiao as Kublai Khan
 Chen Zihan as Qiuyinong (Hong Qigong's lover)
 Huang Ming as Long Jiu (Jinlun Guoshi's junior)

Soundtrack

Reception
Since the series was first announced, it was wrapped up in various controversies. In particular, the casting of Michelle Chen attracted a large outcry by fans of the original novel, who called Chen the "fattest Xiaolongnü (little dragon lady)" that they have ever seen. When the show first premiered on Hunan TV, it was heavily panned for its bad writing, cheaply made actions scenes and a story that completely departs from the novel. Critics call the show "a vulgar mess possessing little artistic value", and "a production that completely destroyed the spirit of the original story".

References

External links
 The Condor Heroes on Sina Weibo

Chinese wuxia television series
2014 Chinese television series debuts
2015 Chinese television series endings
Television shows based on The Return of the Condor Heroes
Television series set in the Southern Song
Television series set in the Mongol Empire
Television series about orphans
Television shows written by Yu Zheng
Television series by Huanyu Film